Radio Valencia Televisión (1958 - 1962) was a Venezuelan regional television network based in Valencia, Carabobo State.

History
On April 30, 1958, Radio Valencia Televisión, channel 13, began operating its test signal, and was officially inaugurated on September 20, 1958.  Its principal investors were Miguel Aché and Teodoro Gubaira.

In 1962, Radio Valencia Televisión ceased its activities and was acquired by Teleinversiones, a company belonging to Diego Cisneros Bermúdez, and it began operating under the name Teletrece.

See also
List of Venezuelan over-the-air television networks and stations

References

External links
Detailed history of television in Venezuela 

1962 disestablishments
Defunct television channels and networks in Venezuela
Television channels and stations established in 1958
Mass media in Valencia, Venezuela
1958 establishments in Venezuela
 Television channels and stations disestablished in 1962